Hermann Michel (20 February 1909 – 8 August 1984?), sometimes referred to as "Preacher", was a Nazi and SS-Oberscharführer (Staff Sergeant).  During World War II, he participated in the extermination of Jews at the Sobibór extermination camp during the Nazi operation known as Aktion Reinhard. According to the Majdanek Museum, a different person named Hermann Michel, born 23.04.1912 in Passau, served at Buchenwald, Majdanek and Sachsenhausen. This person was killed in 1944.

Biography

Hermann Michel was born either in 1906 or 1909. His exact location of origin is not clear. In the mid-1930s, he began working as a nurse at the Berlin-Buch medical center. By the late 1930s, along with Franz Stangl and Christian Wirth, he was working as a head nurse at Hartheim killing center, where the physically and mentally disabled were exterminated by gassing and lethal injection as part of the T-4 Euthanasia Program.

In April 1942, SS-Obersturmführer (First Lieutenant) Franz Stangl was appointed commander of Sobibor. Stangl appointed SS-Oberscharführer Hermann Michel as his deputy, due to their prior work relationship and his extensive experience in the enforced euthanasia programs.

Hermann Michel is described as a tall, graceful man with delicate features and a pleasant voice. His polite and refined speech earned him the nickname "Preacher".

Ada Lichtman, a Sobibór survivor, described how Hermann Michel deceived the new arrivals:

We heard word for word how Oberscharführer Michel, standing on a small table, convinced the people to calm down. He promised them that after the baths all their belongings would be returned to them and that it was time for Jews to become a productive element. At present all of them would be going to the Ukraine to live and work. This address aroused confidence and enthusiasm among the people. They applauded spontaneously and sometimes even danced and sang.

After this convincing speech, the pacified prisoners were directed to hand in their valuables, undress and receive a hair-cut prior to being forced into the gas chambers.

SS-Oberscharführer Kurt Bolender, Commander of Sobibór Camp 3, testified at his trial as to how the extermination process operated:

On 14 October 1943, there was a successful uprising and escape of Jewish prisoners at Sobibór. The destruction of Sobibór caused Aktion Reinhard to come to an end. The surviving 125 Sobibór camp SS personnel, including Hermann Michel, were transferred to Trieste, Italy, to conduct Nazi security warfare against alleged partisans. While in prison in 1971, Franz Stangl stated in an interview, "We were an embarrassment to our [superiors]. They wanted to find ways and means to 'incinerate' us." It was believed by Franz Stangl that Hermann Michel survived World War II and escaped to Egypt, although this has never been proven. 

Some sources suggest that Hermann Michel died on 8 August 1984 in Egypt but it has never been conclusively proven.

References 

1909 births
1984 deaths
Year of death uncertain
People from Neu-Ulm (district)
Aktion T4 personnel
German nurses
People from the Kingdom of Bavaria
Sobibor extermination camp personnel
SS non-commissioned officers